German submarine U-682 was a Type VIIC U-boat of Nazi Germany's Kriegsmarine during World War II. The submarine was laid down on 21 December 1942 at the Howaldtswerke yard at Hamburg, launched on 7 March 1944, and commissioned on 17 April 1944 under the command of Leutnant zur See d.R. Sven Thienemann.

Design
German Type VIIC submarines were preceded by the shorter Type VIIB submarines. U-682 had a displacement of  when at the surface and  while submerged. She had two shafts and two  propellers.

U-682 was fitted with five  torpedo tubes (four fitted at the bow and one at the stern), fourteen torpedoes, one  SK C/35 naval gun, (220 rounds), one  Flak M42 and two twin  C/30 anti-aircraft guns. The boat had a complement of between forty-four and sixty.

Service history

U-682 was destroyed during an air raid on the Howaldtswerke yard in Hamburg in the early hours of 11 March 1945.

Sensors

Passive sonar
U-682 was one of only ten Type VIIC's to be fitted with a Balkongerät (literally 'Balcony apparatus or equipment'). The Balkongerät was used on U-boats (and ). The Balkongerät was standard on the Type XXI and the Type XXIII. Nonetheless, it was also fitted to several Type IXs and one Type X. The Balkongerät was an improved version of Gruppenhorchgerät (GHG) (group listening device). The GHG had 24 hydrophones, the Balkongerät had 48 hydrophones and improved electronics, which enabled more accurate readings to be taken.

References

Bibliography

External links

German Type VIIC submarines
1944 ships
Ships built in Hamburg
U-boats commissioned in 1944
U-boats sunk in 1945
U-boats sunk by British aircraft
World War II submarines of Germany
Maritime incidents in March 1945